The Narude Dam is a gravity dam on the Shō River about  south of Nanto on the border of Toyama and Gifu Prefectures, Japan. It was constructed between 1950 and 1952. The dam has an associated 97 MW hydroelectric power station which was built in two parts. The first part of the power station (37 MW) was commissioned in 1951 and the second part of the power station (60 MW) was commissioned in 1975. Of the nine dams on the Shō River it is the sixth furthest downstream.

See also

Akao Dam – downstream
Tsubawara Dam – upstream

References

Dams in Toyama Prefecture
Dams in Gifu Prefecture
Gravity dams
Dams completed in 1952
Dams on the Shō River
Hydroelectric power stations in Japan